The USC Upstate Spartans women's basketball team, formerly known as the USC Spartanburg Spartans women's basketball team, represents the University of South Carolina Upstate in Spartanburg, South Carolina, United States.  The school's team currently competes in the Big South Conference.

History
The Spartans began play in 1976. As of the end of the 2015-16 season, they have an all-time record of 545-572. They played in NAIA District Six from 1982-1990 and in the Peach Belt Conference from 1990-2007.

Postseason

NCAA Division II tournament results
The Spartans, then known as the USC Spartanburg Spartans, made four appearances in the NCAA Division II women's basketball tournament. They had a combined record of 2–4.

References

External links